Matthew Albright (born September 14, 1991) is a professional Canadian football offensive lineman who is currently retired. He most recently played for the Ottawa Redblacks of the Canadian Football League (CFL). He was drafted 42nd overall in the 2013 CFL Draft by the BC Lions and signed with the club on May 27, 2013. He played CIS football for the Saint Mary's Huskies where he was the AUS nominee in 2012 for the Russ Jackson Award. He played high school football at Prince Andrew High School in Dartmouth, Nova Scotia.

Professional career 
On December 16, 2013, Albright was drafted by the Ottawa Redblacks in the second round of the 2013 CFL Expansion Draft. Nonetheless he spent his first season in the CFL with the BC Lions. Following the 2013 season Albright returned to the team that drafted him. Matthew Albright was active for 14 games over the course of the next two seasons, and his contract was extended following the 2015 CFL season. He retired in February 2018.

References

External links
Ottawa Redblacks bio

1991 births
Living people
BC Lions players
Canadian football offensive linemen
Ottawa Redblacks players
Players of Canadian football from Nova Scotia
Saint Mary's Huskies football players
Sportspeople from Dartmouth, Nova Scotia